Big Torch Key is an island in the lower Florida Keys.

It is located to the north of Middle Torch Key, connected to it via a causeway.

It is named for the Sea Torchwood (Amyris elemifera L.), a native species of tree found on the island.

It is the site of an early settlement.

Although it is the largest of the three large Torch Keys, it is the only one not traversed by U.S. 1.

References

Islands of the Florida Keys
Islands of Monroe County, Florida
Unincorporated communities in Monroe County, Florida
Islands of Florida
Unincorporated communities in Florida